A number of vessels of the Royal Danish Navy have borne the name Peter Tordenskjold, after Peter Tordenskjold.

  , a frigate, in service 1854-1872.
 , a torpedo ram, in service 1882-1908.

References 

Royal Danish Navy ship names